The 2016 New York Mets season was the franchise's 55th season. The Mets opened the season against their 2015 World Series opponent, the Kansas City Royals. This was the first time in the history of the league that World Series opponents played a rematch on Opening Day. This was made possible by interleague play being scattered throughout the season. Despite being below .500 (60–62) as late as August 19, the Mets went 27–13 in their final 40 games to make the postseason in consecutive seasons for the second time in franchise history. They lost to the San Francisco Giants in the Wild Card Game.

Offseason

November
On November 24, 2015, Stolmy Pimentel signed a minor league deal with the Mets.

December
On December 2, 2015, bench coach Bob Geren left the Mets to join the Los Angeles Dodgers to fill the same position left by Tim Wallach who left to join the Miami Marlins in the same capacity. Geren served as the bench coach from 2011 to 2015. Dick Scott was hired to replace Geren on December 16, 2015. On December 3, the Mets signed pitcher Jim Henderson to a minor league deal. On December 9, the Mets traded pitcher Jon Niese to the Pittsburgh Pirates for second baseman Neil Walker. On December 10, the Mets signed Asdrúbal Cabrera to a two-year, $18.5 million contract. On December 14, the Mets signed Buddy Carlyle to a minor league deal for the third time since the offseason leading to the 2014 season. Duane Below was re-signed as well to a minor league deal. Marc Krauss was signed as well to a minor league deal. On December 15, the Mets signed Jerry Blevins to a one-year, $4 million contract with incentives. On December 16, Bartolo Colón was re-signed to a one-year, $7.25 million contract. To make room for Colón, the Mets designated Johnny Monell for assignment on December 18, when the deal became official. On December 23, Alejandro De Aza signed a one-year, $5.75 million contract with the Mets. On December 23, Kirk Nieuwenhuis was claimed off waivers by the Milwaukee Brewers.

January
On January 15, 2016, Nevin Ashley was signed to a minor league deal with an invite to spring training. On January 22, Antonio Bastardo was signed to a two-year, $12 million contract. On January 26, Yoenis Céspedes re-signed with the Mets on a three-year, $75 million contract, with an opt out after the first season. On January 22, Carlos Torres was designated for assignment by the Mets.  On January 29, Neil Walker signed a one-year, $10.55 million deal avoiding arbitration. On January 30, the Mets placed Torres on waivers. Torres cleared waivers on February 1 and elected free agency.

February
On February 2, 2016, Darrell Ceciliani was traded to the Toronto Blue Jays for cash considerations. On February 8, 2016, Roger Bernadina signed with the Mets on a minor-league contract. On February 12, Jenrry Mejía was permanently banned from the MLB after his third performance-enhancing drugs (PED) violation. He became the first player to be banned for life due to PED use, and one of only two living people to be permanently banned, the other being Pete Rose. Mejía is allowed to apply for reinstatement after one year.  However, he must sit out a minimum of two years, meaning that he will not be eligible to pitch again until 2018 at the earliest.

Regular season

Opening Day

The Mets began their 2016 season by losing a close one in Kansas City, falling 4–3 at the hands of the Royals. Matt Harvey, making the Opening Day start, was hit around by the Royals, who took a 4–0 lead into the 8th. However, the Mets scored 3 runs off Joakim Soria to make the game close. In the top of the ninth, facing Royals closer Wade Davis, the Mets put runners at the corners with one out, but Davis struck out David Wright and Yoenis Céspedes to close out the Royals' opening day victory.

April
Following a narrow Opening Day defeat, the Mets split the series in Kansas City behind a scoreless outing by Noah Syndergaard and a two-run home run by Neil Walker. The Mets then returned home and won their home opener 7–2 against the Philadelphia Phillies. Jacob deGrom pitched six strong innings, while Walker and Michael Conforto both had multiple RBI's. The Mets then went on a brief four-game losing streak which dropped them to 2–5. During the slump, the offense struggled to produce. However, the offense caught fire throughout the rest of the month, led by Neil Walker, who hit .315 with 9 home runs and 19 RBI's in his first month with the team. The Mets only scored less than four runs in a game once in April after April 15, and finished the opening month of the season with a 15–7 record.

May
After a surging April, the Mets began to cool down in May. On May 7, Bartolo Colón became the oldest player to hit his first career home run, at 42 years and 349 days old. It came off San Diego Padres pitcher, James Shields in a game against San Diego. Mets pitchers continued to hit when on May 11, Noah Syndergaard hit two home runs off of Los Angeles Dodgers pitcher, Kenta Maeda. The second home run gave the Mets the lead in the 5th inning. On May 27, the Mets returned to Citi Field to play the Los Angeles Dodgers in what was the first game in a 1986 World Championship 30th Anniversary Weekend Celebration. New York won the first game on a Curtis Granderson walk-off home run, but lost the next two games, highlighted by Noah Syndergaard throwing behind Dodgers second baseman Chase Utley, an act that was seen as intentional as the Mets were trying to get revenge for Utley's questionable slide against the Mets in 2015 NLDS. In the series finale, Colón and Clayton Kershaw battled on ESPN Sunday Night Baseball. However, Mets closer Jeurys Familia allowed three runs in the 9th to lose the game. The Mets finished the month with a record of 14–15. This dropped them to second place in the NL East to the Washington Nationals, who would never relinquish their lead in the division.

June
The Mets continued to struggle in June, in part due to an offense not producing many runs, in particular with runners in scoring position. Neil Walker, who had led the Mets in most offensive categories for the first two months, began to have a drop off in production. The Mets also could not beat teams in their division, getting swept by the Braves and Nationals. Pitching also became an issue for the Mets. While Bartolo Colón and Noah Syndergaard continued to pitch well, Steven Matz, Jacob deGrom and Matt Harvey would not win a game in June. Also that month, Lucas Duda and David Wright went down with back and neck injuries, respectively. While Duda would return to the Mets later in the year, Wright would wind up missing the entire season. Duda would be replaced by James Loney, and the Mets brought back former shortstop José Reyes to fill in for Wright at third base. The move was greeted with criticism, as Reyes had been arrested for domestic violence in the offseason. However, Reyes filled in adequately, although he would not make his season debut until July 5. At the end of the month, following a sweep at the hands of the Nationals, it was announced that both Steven Matz and Noah Syndergaard had been pitching with bone spurs in their throwing arms.

July
The Mets returned home to Citi Field to start the month and swept a four-game series from the Chicago Cubs, similar to what they had done in the 2015 NLCS. Only July 4, against the Miami Marlins, the Mets fell behind 6–0 in the 4th inning, but would rally to win the game 8–6. The Mets' celebration was to be short-lived, however, as it was announced that Matt Harvey was placed on the 15-day DL. Shortly after, he opted to have season-ending surgery to resolve a condition called thoracic outlet syndrome. José Reyes would return to the Mets on July 5, just in time for a pivotal four game series with the divisional rival Washington Nationals before the All-Star Break. In the first game of the series, the Mets would hit four home runs to win 9–7. The following day, it was announced that Bartolo Colón had been selected to replace Madison Bumgarner in the 2016 MLB All-Star Game, joining teammates Noah Syndergaard, Jeurys Familia and Yoenis Céspedes. However, hours after this was announced, Syndergaard and Céspedes were both injured in a 3–1 loss to the Nationals. These injuries would force the two to miss the All-Star Game, which they were projected to start in. After the All-Star Break, Jacob deGrom pitched arguably the best game of his young career, as he dominated the Phillies in a complete game shutout, while striking out 7 batters. The Mets continued to play well until the final week of the month, when All-Star closer Jeurys Familia, who had converted all of his 36 save opportunities in the season at that point, uncharacteristically blew the saves in back to back games against the St. Louis Cardinals and Colorado Rockies. The Mets finished the month with a 54–50 record, and it became clear that GM Sandy Alderson would have to make a deadline trade if the Mets were to make the postseason.

August
In August, Sandy Alderson would come through with a deal at the trade deadline, as he acquired outfielder Jay Bruce from the Cincinnati Reds in exchange for second baseman Dilson Herrera and pitching prospect Max Wotell. Bruce would make his Mets debut the following day, in a 7–1 win over the crosstown rival New York Yankees in the second game of the yearly four game Subway Series. Bruce would help the Mets tie the series, as he hit a go-ahead three-run home run at Yankee Stadium in the series finale in a 4–1 Mets victory. However, Bruce's initial spark would quickly burn out, as he began to slump, only adding to the Mets' offensive struggles. To make matters worse, star outfielder Yoenis Céspedes, who undoubtedly had been the best hitter on the team, was diagnosed with strained right quadriceps, and was placed on the 15-day DL. Without him, the Mets' record fell under .500 after an 8–6 loss to the San Diego Padres on August 12. However, the Mets would rally to win the next two games over the Padres, highlighted by Steven Matz taking a no-hitter into the 8th inning on August 14. Matz struck out 8 batters in that game, which would ultimately wind up being his last game of the year, as he would later undergo surgery for a bone spur in the left elbow, therefore ending his season. The Mets would also lose second baseman Neil Walker for the season after he required surgery to fix a herniated disc in his back. Luckily for the Mets, Céspedes would return to the team on August 19 in San Francisco against the Giants, in what would be considered the turning point of the Mets season. The following day, with the Mets record at 60–62, Céspedes hit two home runs in a 9–5 victory, and homered again the next night on ESPN Sunday Night Baseball, as the Mets would get their record back to .500. They then took series from the St. Louis Cardinals and the Philadelphia Phillies. New York would also win three of four against the Miami Marlins heading into September, highlighted by a Céspedes walk-off home run in a 2–1 win over Miami on August 29.

September
Heading into the final month of the regular season, the Mets remained in a race for a Wild-Card spot along with the Marlins, the San Francisco Giants, and the St. Louis Cardinals. To start the month, the Mets sent out Jacob deGrom to start against the Marlins, looking to close out a four-game sweep at Citi Field. However, deGrom struggled as the Mets lost the series finale 6–4. It was later revealed that these struggles were injury related, and deGrom underwent season-ending surgery on his ulnar nerve in order to relieve discomfort in his elbow and numbness in his fingers which had plagued him during the season. The loss of deGrom meant that the Mets had lost 3/5 of their Opening Day starting rotation. In addition to this, Zack Wheeler, who was expected to return in July following Tommy John surgery that kept him sidelined for the entire 2015 season, would suffer setbacks in a minor league rehab assignment, and never returned in 2016. Fortunately for the Mets, Noah Syndergaard and Bartolo Colón managed to stay healthy throughout the entire season, and minor leaguers Seth Lugo and Robert Gsellman would provide great starts while filling in for the injured stars down the stretch, helping guide the Mets to multiple series wins throughout the final month. Some pivotal moments of September for the Mets included a weekend sweep at home over the Minnesota Twins, highlighted by Curtis Granderson hitting a game-tying home run in the 11th inning and a walk-off home run in the 12th inning in the second game of the series. Later on in the home stand, after the Mets were swept by the visiting rival Atlanta Braves, New York began a four-game series against the Phillies with a 9–8 win in 11 innings. This game would go down as one of the best games of the entire MLB season, as it featured multiple lead changes and comebacks by the Mets. The Phillies held a 6–4 lead heading into the bottom of the 9th, and with the Mets down to their final strike, José Reyes hit a game-tying two-run home run to send the game to extra innings. In the 11th inning, after the Phillies scored two runs to take an 8–6 lead, Asdrúbal Cabrera hit a walk-off three-run home run, capped off with a dramatic bat flip celebration. The Mets would end their regular season home slate by taking three of four from Philadelphia, including a 17–0 win in the home finale. After this, the Mets took two of three in Miami before heading to Philadelphia to end the season, needing to win the series in order to qualify for a Wild Card spot.

October
The New York Mets played the San Francisco Giants in the National League Wild Card game on October 5, 2016, and was presented on ESPN. The game was notable for two quality pitching performances by the Mets' Noah Syndergaard, who pitched 7 innings, allowed 0 runs on two hits, striking out 10 batters, and Giants' Madison Bumgarner, who pitched a complete-game shutout on 4 hits while striking out six. Both teams failed to produce any runs for 8 innings, as  Noah Syndergaard and Addison Reed held the giants to no runs, while Madison Bumgarner did the same by himself. During the 9th inning, Conor Gillaspie, Giants' third basemen, hit a go-ahead 3-run homer in the top of the 9th off of Mets' closer Jeurys Familia, placing the Mets in a three-run deficit that would eventually cost them the game. Madison Bumgarner would earn the win and Jeurys Familia would receive the loss. The Giants would go on to lose to the eventual World Series champion Chicago Cubs in 4 games in the National League Division Series.

Detailed record

Most runs scored in a game: 17 runs (September 25 vs Philadelphia)
Most runs allowed in a game: 13 runs (August 17 vs Arizona)
Most hits in a game: 22 hits (July 3 vs Chicago) 
Longest winning streak: 8 (April 22 - April 30)
Longest losing streak: 4 (April 9–12, May 12–15, June 26–29, July 27–30, August 9–12)

Games played as of October 2, 2016.

Season standings

National League East

National League Division Leaders

Record vs. opponents

Game log

Regular season

|-  style="text-align:center; background:#fcc"
| 1 || April 3 || @ Royals || 3–4 || Edinson Vólquez (1–0) || Matt Harvey (0–1) || Wade Davis (1) || Kauffman Stadium (40,030) || 0–1
|-  style="text-align:center; background:#cfc"
| 2 || April 5 || @ Royals || 2–0 || Noah Syndergaard (1–0) || Chris Young (0–1) || Jeurys Familia (1) || Kauffman Stadium (39,782) || 1–1
|-  style="text-align:center; background:#cfc"
| 3 || April 8 || Phillies || 7–2 || Jacob deGrom (1–0) || Jerad Eickhoff (0–1) || — || Citi Field (44,099) || 2–1
|-  style="text-align:center; background:#fcc"
| 4 || April 9 || Phillies || 0–1 || Vincent Velasquez (1–0) || Bartolo Colón (0–1) || Jeanmar Gómez (1) || Citi Field (37,083) || 2–2
|-  style="text-align:center; background:#fcc"
| 5 || April 10 || Phillies || 2–5 || Jeremy Hellickson (1–0) || Matt Harvey (0–2) || Jeanmar Gómez (2) || Citi Field (37,233) || 2–3
|-  style="text-align:center; background:#fcc"
| 6 || April 11 || Marlins || 3–10 || Chris Narveson (1–0) || Steven Matz (0–1) || — || Citi Field (24,318) || 2–4
|-  style="text-align:center; background:#fcc"
| 7 || April 12 || Marlins || 1–2 || David Phelps (2–0) || Jim Henderson (0–1) || A. J. Ramos (2) || Citi Field (28,923) || 2–5
|-  style="text-align:center; background:#cfc"
| 8 || April 13 || Marlins || 2–1 || Jerry Blevins (1–0) || Dustin McGowan (0–1) || Jeurys Familia (2) || Citi Field (22,113) || 3–5
|-  style="text-align:center; background:#cfc"
| 9 || April 15 || @ Indians || 6–5 || Bartolo Colón (1–1) || Cody Anderson (0–1) || Jeurys Familia (3) || Progressive Field (15,365) || 4–5
|-  style="text-align:center; background:#fcc"
| 10 || April 16 || @ Indians || 5–7 || Josh Tomlin (1–0) || Matt Harvey (0–3) || Cody Allen (3) || Progressive Field (20,165) || 4–6
|-  style="text-align:center; background:#cfc"
| 11 || April 17 || @ Indians || 6–0 || Steven Matz (1–1) || Corey Kluber (0–3) || — || Progressive Field (17,621) || 5–6
|-  style="text-align:center; background:#cfc"
| 12 || April 18 || @ Phillies || 5–2 || Noah Syndergaard (2–0)|| Jerad Eickhoff (1–2) || — || Citizens Bank Park (21,585) || 6–6
|-  style="text-align:center; background:#cfc"
| 13 || April 19 || @ Phillies || 11–1 || Logan Verrett (1–0) || Vincent Velasquez (2–1) || — || Citizens Bank Park (22,417) || 7–6
|-  style="text-align:center; background:#fcc"
| 14 || April 20 || @ Phillies || 4–5 (11) || Jeanmar Gómez (2–0) || Hansel Robles (0–1) || — || Citizens Bank Park (20,057) || 7–7
|-  style="text-align:center; background:#cfc"
| 15 || April 22 || @ Braves || 6–3 || Matt Harvey (1–3) || Bud Norris (1–3) || Jeurys Familia (4) || Turner Field (21,173) || 8–7
|-  style="text-align:center; background:#cfc"
| 16 || April 23 || @ Braves || 8–2 || Steven Matz (2–1) || Jhoulys Chacín (0–1) || — || Turner Field (35,230) || 9–7
|-  style="text-align:center; background:#cfc"
| 17 || April 24 || @ Braves || 3–2 || Jacob deGrom (2–0) || Aaron Blair (0–1) || Jeurys Familia (5) || Turner Field (32,085) || 10–7
|-  style="text-align:center; background:#cfc"
| 18 || April 25 || Reds || 5–3 || Logan Verrett (2–0) || J. C. Ramírez (0–1) || Jeurys Familia (6) || Citi Field (30,250) || 11–7
|-  style="text-align:center; background:#cfc"
| 19 || April 26 || Reds || 4–3 || Logan Verrett (3–0) || Tony Cingrani (0–2) || Jeurys Familia (7) || Citi Field (26,978) || 12–7
|-  style="text-align:center; background:#cfc"
| 20 || April 27 || Reds || 5–2 || Matt Harvey (2–3) || Jon Moscot (0–1) || Addison Reed (1) || Citi Field (31,481) || 13–7
|-  style="text-align:center; background:#cfc"
| 21 || April 29 || Giants || 13–1 || Steven Matz (3–1) || Jake Peavy (1–2) || — || Citi Field (39,764) || 14–7
|-  style="text-align:center; background:#cfc"
| 22 || April 30 || Giants || 6–5 || Jacob deGrom (3–0) || Matt Cain (0–3) || Jeurys Familia (8) || Citi Field (44,466) || 15–7
|-

|-  style="text-align:center; background:#fcc"
| 23 || May 1 || Giants || 1–6  || Madison Bumgarner (3–2) || Noah Syndergaard (2–1) || — || Citi Field (39,077) || 15–8
|-  style="text-align:center; background:#cfc"
| 24 || May 2 || Braves || 4–1 || Bartolo Colón (2–1) || Mike Foltynewicz (0–1) || — || Citi Field (23,847) || 16–8
|-  style="text-align:center; background:#fcc"
| 25 || May 3 || Braves || 0–3 || Matt Wisler (1–2) || Matt Harvey (2–4) || Arodys Vizcaíno (3) || Citi Field (27,356)|| 16–9
|-  style="text-align:center; background:#cfc"
| 26 || May 4 || Braves || 8–0 || Steven Matz (4–1) || Jhoulys Chacín (1–2) || — || Citi Field (31,783)|| 17–9
|-  style="text-align:center; background:#fcc"
| 27 || May 5 || @ Padres || 5–3 || Colin Rea (3–1) || Jacob deGrom (3–1) || Fernando Rodney (7) || Petco Park (21,608) || 17–10
|-  style="text-align:center; background:#fcc"
| 28 || May 6 || @ Padres || 0–2 || Drew Pomeranz (3–3) || Noah Syndergaard (2–2) || Fernando Rodney (8) || Petco Park (30,108) || 17–11
|-  style="text-align:center; background:#cfc"
| 29 || May 7 || @ Padres || 6–3 || Bartolo Colón (3–1) || James Shields (1–5) || Jeurys Familia (9) || Petco Park (41,028) || 18–11
|-  style="text-align:center; background:#cfc"
| 30 || May 8 || @ Padres || 4–3 || Matt Harvey (3–4) || Andrew Cashner (2–3) || Jeurys Familia (10) || Petco Park (27,461) || 19–11
|-  style="text-align:center; background:#cfc"
| 31 || May 9 || @ Dodgers || 4–2 || Steven Matz (5–1) || Scott Kazmir (2–3) || Jeurys Familia (11) || Dodger Stadium (42,186)|| 20–11
|-  style="text-align:center; background:#fcc"
| 32 || May 10 || @ Dodgers || 2–3  || Kenley Jansen (1–0) || Hansel Robles (0–2) || — || Dodger Stadium (38,858) || 20–12
|-  style="text-align:center; background:#cfc"
| 33 || May 11 || @ Dodgers || 4–3 || Noah Syndergaard (3–2) || Kenta Maeda (3–2) || Jeurys Familia (12) || Dodger Stadium (40,970) || 21–12
|-  style="text-align:center; background:#fcc"
| 34 || May 12 || @ Dodgers || 0–5 || Clayton Kershaw (5–1) || Bartolo Colón (3–2)  || — || Dodger Stadium (41,765) || 21–13
|-  style="text-align:center; background:#fcc"
| 35 || May 13 || @ Rockies || 2–5 || Jon Gray (1–1) || Matt Harvey (3–5) || Jake McGee (10) || Coors Field (38,712) || 21–14
|-  style="text-align:center; background:#fcc"
| 36 || May 14 || @ Rockies || 4–7 || Eddie Butler (2–1) || Logan Verrett (3–1) || Jake McGee (11) || Coors Field (34,362)|| 21–15
|-  style="text-align:center; background:#fcc"
| 37 || May 15 || @ Rockies || 3–4 || Tyler Chatwood (5–3) || Jim Henderson (0–2) || Jake McGee (12) || Coors Field (36,901) || 21–16
|-  style="text-align:center; background:#cfc"
| 38 || May 17 || Nationals || 2–0 || Noah Syndergaard (4–2) || Max Scherzer (4–3) || Jeurys Familia (13) || Citi Field (36,701) || 22–16
|-  style="text-align:center; background:#fcc"
| 39 || May 18 || Nationals || 1–7 || Gio González (3–1) || Bartolo Colón (3–3) || — || Citi Field (30,100) || 22–17
|-  style="text-align:center; background:#fcc"
| 40 || May 19 || Nationals || 1–9 || Stephen Strasburg (7–0) || Matt Harvey (3–6) || — || Citi Field (39,494) || 22–18
|-  style="text-align:center; background:#cfc"
| 41 || May 20 || Brewers || 3–2 || Steven Matz (6–1) || Wily Peralta (2–5) || Jeurys Familia (14) || Citi Field (36,239) || 23–18
|-  style="text-align:center; background:#cfc"
| 42 || May 21 || Brewers || 5–4 || Jeurys Familia (1–0) || Michael Blazek (1–1) || — || Citi Field (39,688) || 24–18
|-  style="text-align:center; background:#cfc"
| 43 || May 22 || Brewers || 3–1 || Noah Syndergaard (5–2) || Chase Anderson (2–6) || Jeurys Familia (15) || Citi Field (40,173) || 25–18
|-  style="text-align:center; background:#cfc"
| 44 || May 23 || @ Nationals || 7–1 || Bartolo Colón (4–3) || Gio González (3–2) || — || Nationals Park (31,264) || 26–18
|-  style="text-align:center; background:#fcc"
| 45 || May 24 || @ Nationals || 4–7 || Stephen Strasburg (8–0) || Matt Harvey (3–7) || — || Nationals Park (33,096) || 26–19
|-  style="text-align:center; background:#cfc"
| 46 || May 25 || @ Nationals || 2–0 || Steven Matz (7–1) || Tanner Roark (3–4) || Jeurys Familia (16) || Nationals Park (38,700) || 27–19
|-  style="text-align:center; background:#cfc"
| 47 || May 27 || Dodgers || 6–5 || Jeurys Familia (2–0) || Pedro Báez (0–1) || — || Citi Field (43,462) || 28–19
|-  style="text-align:center; background:#fcc"
| 48 || May 28 || Dodgers || 1–9 || Kenta Maeda (4–3) || Logan Verrett (3–2) || — || Citi Field (42,227) || 28–20
|-  style="text-align:center; background:#fcc"
| 49 || May 29 || Dodgers || 2–4 || Adam Liberatore (1–0) || Jeurys Familia (2–1) || Kenley Jansen (15) || Citi Field (42,287) || 28–21
|-  style="text-align:center; background:#cfc"
| 50 || May 30 || White Sox || 1–0 || Matt Harvey (4–7) || José Quintana (5–5) || Jeurys Familia (17) || Citi Field (38,339) || 29–21
|-  style="text-align:center; background:#fcc"
| 51 || May 31 || White Sox || 4–6 || Dan Jennings (2–1) || Hansel Robles (0–3) || David Robertson (13) || Citi Field (32,781) || 29–22
|-

|-  style="text-align:center; background:#fcc"
| 52 || June 1 || White Sox || 1–2 (13) || Matt Albers (2–4) || Logan Verrett (3–3) || — || Citi Field (34,160) || 29–23
|-  style="text-align:center; background:#cfc"
| 53 || June 3 || @ Marlins || 6–2 || Noah Syndergaard (6–2) || Tom Koehler (3–6) || — || Marlins Park (22,269) || 30–23
|-  style="text-align:center; background:#cfc"
| 54 || June 4 || @ Marlins || 6–4 || Jim Henderson (1–2) || David Phelps (4–4) || Jeurys Familia (18) || Marlins Park (24,668) || 31–23
|-  style="text-align:center; background:#fcc"
| 55 || June 5 || @ Marlins || 0–1 || José Fernández (9–2) || Matt Harvey (4–8) || A. J. Ramos (18) || Marlins Park (28,196) || 31–24
|-  style="text-align:center; background:#cccccc"
|  || June 6 || @ Pirates || colspan=4| Postponed (rain); rescheduled for June 7 || PNC Park ||
|-  style="text-align:center; background:#fcc"
| 56 || June 7 (1) || @ Pirates || 1–3 || Jon Niese (6–2) || Steven Matz (7–2) || Mark Melancon (18) || PNC Park || 31–25
|-  style="text-align:center; background:#fcc"
| 57 || June 7 (2) || @ Pirates || 1–3 || Juan Nicasio (5–4) || Jacob deGrom (3–2) || Mark Melancon (19) || PNC Park (26,605) || 31–26
|-  style="text-align:center; background:#cfc"
| 58 || June 8 || @ Pirates || 6–5 (10) || Addison Reed (1–0) || Cory Luebke (0–1) || Jeurys Familia (19) || PNC Park (28,084) || 32–26
|-  style="text-align:center; background:#cfc"
| 59 || June 9 || @ Brewers || 5–2|| Bartolo Colón (5–3) || Jimmy Nelson (5–5) || Jeurys Familia (20) || Miller Park (22,980) || 33–26
|-  style="text-align:center; background:#cfc"
| 60 || June 10 || @ Brewers || 2–1 (11) || Jerry Blevins (2–0) || Blaine Boyer (1–1) || Jeurys Familia (21) || Miller Park (27,358) || 34–26
|-  style="text-align:center; background:#fcc"
| 61 || June 11 || @ Brewers || 4–7 || Wily Peralta (4–7) || Logan Verrett (3–4) || Jeremy Jeffress (17) || Miller Park (38,423) || 34–27
|-  style="text-align:center; background:#fcc"
| 62 || June 12 || @ Brewers || 3–5 || Zach Davies (5–3) || Steven Matz (7–3) || Jeremy Jeffress (18) || Miller Park (32,491) || 34–28
|-  style="text-align:center; background:#fcc"
| 63 || June 14 || Pirates || 0–4 || Jameson Taillon (1–0) || Jacob deGrom (3–3) || — || Citi Field (35,124) || 34–29
|-  style="text-align:center; background:#cfc"
| 64 || June 15 || Pirates || 11–2 || Noah Syndergaard (7–2) || Jeff Locke (5–5) || — || Citi Field (32,117) || 35–29
|-  style="text-align:center; background:#cfc"
| 65 || June 16 || Pirates || 6–4 || Bartolo Colón (6–3) || Juan Nicasio (5–6) || Jeurys Familia (22) || Citi Field (33,052) || 36–29
|-  style="text-align:center; background:#fcc"
| 66 || June 17 || Braves || 1–5 || John Gant (1–1) || Matt Harvey (4–9) || — || Citi Field (40,148) || 36–30
|-  style="text-align:center; background:#fcc"
| 67 || June 18 || Braves || 3–4 || Darío Álvarez (1–0) || Addison Reed (1–1) || Jim Johnson (1) || Citi Field (32,134) || 36–31
|-  style="text-align:center; background:#fcc"
| 68 || June 19 || Braves || 0–6 || Julio Teherán (3–7) || Jacob deGrom (3–4) || — || Citi Field (41,576) || 36–32
|-  style="text-align:center; background:#cfc"
| 69 || June 21 || Royals || 2–0 || Hansel Robles (1–3) || Ian Kennedy (5–6) || Jeurys Familia (23) || Citi Field (40,122) || 37–32
|-  style="text-align:center; background:#cfc"
| 70 || June 22 || Royals || 4–3 || Noah Syndergaard (8–2) || Joakim Soria (3–3) || Jeurys Familia (24) || Citi Field (35,185) || 38–32
|-  style="text-align:center; background:#fcc"
| 71 || June 23 || @ Braves || 3–4 || Jim Johnson (1–4) || Addison Reed (1–2) || Arodys Vizcaíno (9) || Turner Field (22,324) || 38–33
|-  style="text-align:center; background:#cfc"
| 72 || June 24 || @ Braves || 8–6 || Hansel Robles (2–3) || Aaron Blair (0–5) || Jeurys Familia (25) || Turner Field (25,565) || 39–33
|-  style="text-align:center; background:#cfc"
| 73 || June 25 || @ Braves || 1–0 (11) || Addison Reed (2–2)  || Darío Álvarez (1–1) || Jeurys Familia (26) || Turner Field (40,879) || 40–33
|-  style="text-align:center; background:#fcc"
| 74 || June 26 || @ Braves || 2–5|| Bud Norris (3–7) || Bartolo Colón (6–4) || Arodys Vizcaíno (10) || Turner Field (20,484) || 40–34
|-  style="text-align:center; background:#fcc"
| 75 || June 27 || @ Nationals ||4–11 || Joe Ross (7–4) || Noah Syndergaard (8–3) || — || Nationals Park (33,109) || 40–35
|-  style="text-align:center; background:#fcc"
| 76 || June 28 || @ Nationals || 0–5 || Óliver Pérez (2–1) || Matt Harvey (4–10) || — || Nationals Park (29,918) || 40–36
|-  style="text-align:center; background:#fcc"
| 77 || June 29 || @ Nationals || 2–4 || Max Scherzer (9–5) || Logan Verrett (3–5) || Shawn Kelley (4) || Nationals Park (33,386) || 40–37
|-  style="text-align:center; background:#cfc"
| 78 || June 30 || Cubs || 4–3 || Erik Goeddel (1–0) || Joel Peralta (1–1) || Jeurys Familia (27) || Citi Field (40,122) || 41–37
|-

|-  style="text-align:center; background:#cfc"
| 79 || July 1 || Cubs || 10–2 || Jacob deGrom (4–4) || Jason Hammel (7–5)  || — || Citi Field (34,294)|| 42–37
|-  style="text-align:center; background:#cfc"
| 80 || July 2 || Cubs || 4–3 || Bartolo Colón (7–4) || Jake Arrieta (12–3) || Jeurys Familia (28) || Citi Field (41,151) || 43–37
|-  style="text-align:center; background:#cfc"
| 81 || July 3 || Cubs || 14–3 || Noah Syndergaard (9–3) || Jon Lester (9–4) || — || Citi Field (36,137) || 44–37
|-  style="text-align:center; background:#cfc"
| 82 || July 4 || Marlins || 8–6 || Jerry Blevins (3–0) || Fernando Rodney (0–2) || Jeurys Familia (29) || Citi Field (30,424) || 45–37
|-  style="text-align:center; background:#fcc"
| 83 || July 5 || Marlins || 2–5 || Wei-Yin Chen (5–3) || Steven Matz (7–4) || A.J. Ramos (25) || Citi Field (29,477) || 45–38
|-  style="text-align:center; background:#cfc"
| 84 || July 6 || Marlins || 4–2 || Jacob deGrom (5–4) || Justin Nicolino (2–5) || Jeurys Familia (30) || Citi Field (26,191) || 46–38
|-  style="text-align:center; background:#cfc"
| 85 || July 7 || Nationals || 9–7 || Hansel Robles (3–3) || Óliver Pérez (2–2) || Jeurys Familia (31) || Citi Field (37,569) || 47–38
|-  style="text-align:center; background:#fcc"
| 86 || July 8 || Nationals || 1–3 || Stephen Strasburg (12–0) || Noah Syndergaard (9–4) || Jonathan Papelbon (18) || Citi Field (35,030) || 47–39
|-  style="text-align:center; background:#fcc"
| 87 || July 9 || Nationals || 1–6 || Max Scherzer (10–6) || Logan Verrett (3–6) || — || Citi Field (36,953) || 47–40
|-  style="text-align:center; background:#fcc"
| 88 || July 10 || Nationals || 2–3 || Gio Gonzalez (5–8) || Steven Matz (7–5) || Jonathan Papelbon (19) || Citi Field (35,778) || 47–41
|- style="text-align:center; background:#bbcaff;"
| colspan="9" | 87th All-Star Game in San Diego, California
|-  style="text-align:center; background:#cfc"
| 89 || July 15 || @ Phillies || 5–3 || Bartolo Colón (8–4) || Jeremy Hellickson (6–7) || Jeurys Familia (32) || Citizens Bank Park (28,076) || 48–41
|-  style="text-align:center; background:#fcc"
| 90 || July 16 || @ Phillies || 2–4 || Edubray Ramos (1–0) || Jerry Blevins (3–1) || Jeanmar Gómez (25) || Citizens Bank Park (37,324) || 48–42
|-  style="text-align:center; background:#cfc"
| 91 || July 17 || @ Phillies || 5–0 || Jacob deGrom (6–4) || Zach Eflin (2–3)  || — || Citizens Bank Park (30,894) || 49–42
|-  style="text-align:center; background:#fcc"
| 92 || July 18 || @ Cubs || 1–5 || Jon Lester (10–4) || Steven Matz (7–6) || Héctor Rondón (16) || Wrigley Field (41,353) || 49–43
|-  style="text-align:center; background:#cfc"
| 93 || July 19 || @ Cubs || 2–1 || Hansel Robles (4–3) || Héctor Rondón (1–2) || Jeurys Familia (33) || Wrigley Field (41,456) || 50–43
|-  style="text-align:center; background:#fcc"
| 94 || July 20 || @ Cubs || 2–6 || Kyle Hendricks (9–6) || Bartolo Colón (8–5) || — || Wrigley Field (41,210) || 50–44
|-  style="text-align:center; background:#cfc"
| 95 || July 22 || @ Marlins || 5–3  || Hansel Robles (5–3) || David Phelps (4–5) || Jeurys Familia (34) || Marlins Park (23,661) || 51–44
|-  style="text-align:center; background:#fcc"
| 96 || July 23 || @ Marlins || 2–7 || José Fernández (12–4) || Jacob deGrom (6–5) || — || Marlins Park (26,841) || 51–45
|-  style="text-align:center; background:#cfc"
| 97 || July 24 || @ Marlins || 3–0 || Steven Matz (8–6) || José Ureña (1–2) || Jeurys Familia (35) || Marlins Park (25,004) || 52–45
|-  style="text-align:center; background:#cccccc"
| || July 25 || Cardinals || colspan=4| Postponed (inclement weather)  Rescheduled for 7/26 as part of a doubleheader || Citi Field || 
|-  style="text-align:center; background:#fcc"
| 98 || July 26 (1) || Cardinals || 2–3 || Carlos Martínez (10–6) || Noah Syndergaard (9–5) || Seung-hwan Oh (5) || Citi Field || 52–46
|-  style="text-align:center; background:#cfc"
| 99 || July 26 (2) || Cardinals || 3–1 || Bartolo Colon (9–5) || Jaime García (7–7) || Jeurys Familia (36) || Citi Field (37,116) || 53–46
|-  style="text-align:center; background:#fcc"
| 100 || July 27 || Cardinals || 4–5 || Jonathan Broxton (3–2) || Jeurys Familia (2–2) || Seung Hwan Oh (6) || Citi Field (37,851) || 53–47
|-  style="text-align:center; background:#fcc"
| 101 || July 28 || Rockies || 1–2 || Jordan Lyles (3–3) || Jeurys Familia (2–3) || Carlos Estévez (11) || Citi Field (38,292) || 53–48
|-  style="text-align:center; background:#fcc"
| 102 || July 29 || Rockies || 1–6 || Tyler Chatwood (10–6) || Steven Matz (8–7) || — || Citi Field (40,035) || 53–49
|-  style="text-align:center; background:#fcc"
| 103 || July 30 || Rockies || 2–7 || Jorge de la Rosa (7–7) || Bartolo Colon (9–6) || — || Citi Field (42,207) || 53–50
|-  style="text-align:center; background:#cfc"
| 104 || July 31 || Rockies || 6–4 || Jerry Blevins (4–1) || Boone Logan (1–1) || Jeurys Familia  (37) || Citi Field (36,279) || 54–50
|-

|-  style="text-align:center; background:#fcc"
| 105 || August 1 || Yankees || 5–6 (10) || Adam Warren (4–2) || Seth Lugo (0–1) || Dellin Betances (1) || Citi Field (42,125) || 54–51
|-  style="text-align:center; background:#cfc"
| 106 || August 2 || Yankees || 7–1 || Jacob deGrom (7–5) || Masahiro Tanaka (7–4) || － || Citi Field (42,819) || 55–51
|-  style="text-align:center; background:#fcc"
| 107 || August 3 || @ Yankees || 5–9 || Luis Severino (1–6) || Steven Matz (8–8) || － || Yankee Stadium (48,339) || 55–52
|-  style="text-align:center; background:#cfc"
| 108 || August 4 || @ Yankees || 4–1 || Bartolo Colón (10–6) || Nathan Eovaldi (9–8) || Jeurys Familia  (38) || Yankee Stadium (48,153) || 56–52
|-  style="text-align:center; background:#fcc"
| 109 || August 5 || @ Tigers || 3–4 || Justin Verlander (12–6) || Noah Syndergaard (9–6) || Francisco Rodríguez (31) || Comerica Park (33,032) || 56–53
|-  style="text-align:center; background:#fcc"
| 110 || August 6 || @ Tigers || 5–6 || Matt Boyd (3–2) || Logan Verrett (3–7) || Francisco Rodríguez (32) || Comerica Park (41,053) || 56–54
|-  style="text-align:center; background:#cfc"
| 111 || August 7 || @ Tigers || 3–1 || Addison Reed (3–2) || Francisco Rodríguez (1–2) || Jeurys Familia  (39) || Comerica Park (32,074) || 57–54
|-  style="text-align:center; background:#fcc"
| 112 || August 9 || Diamondbacks || 3–5 || Zack Greinke (11–3) || Hansel Robles (5–4) || Jake Barrett (4) || Citi Field (31,884) || 57–55
|-  style="text-align:center; background:#fcc"
| 113 || August 10 || Diamondbacks || 2–3 (12) || Randall Delgado (3–1) || Jerry Blevins (4–2) || — || Citi Field (31,277) || 57–56
|-  style="text-align:center; background:#fcc"
| 114 || August 11 || Diamondbacks || 0–9 || Braden Shipley (2–1) || Noah Syndergaard (9–7) || — || Citi Field (39,271) || 57–57
|-  style="text-align:center; background:#fcc"
| 115 || August 12 || Padres || 6–8 || Paul Clemens (2–2) || Logan Verrett (3–8) || Brandon Maurer (5) || Citi Field (24,442) || 57–58
|-  style="text-align:center; background:#cfc"
| 116 || August 13 || Padres || 3–2 (11) || Gabriel Ynoa (1–0) || Brandon Maurer (0–3) || — || Citi Field (38,854) || 58–58
|-  style="text-align:center; background:#cfc"
| 117 || August 14 || Padres || 5–1 || Steven Matz (9–8) || Clayton Richard (0–2) || — || Citi Field (26,612) || 59–58
|-  style="text-align:center; background:#fcc"
| 118 || August 15 || @ Diamondbacks || 6–10 || Robbie Ray (6–11) || Bartolo Colon (10–7) || — || Chase Field (17,340) || 59–59
|-  style="text-align:center; background:#cfc"
| 119 || August 16 || @ Diamondbacks || 7–5 || Noah Syndergaard (10–7) || Braden Shipley (2–2) || Jeurys Familia  (40) || Chase Field (20,790) || 60–59
|-  style="text-align:center; background:#fcc"
| 120 || August 17 || @ Diamondbacks || 5–13 || Zack Godley (4–2) || Jonathon Niese (8–7) || — || Chase Field (18,469) || 60–60
|-  style="text-align:center; background:#fcc"
| 121 || August 18 || @ Giants || 7–10 || Madison Bumgarner (12–7) || Jacob deGrom (7–6) || Santiago Casilla (28) || AT&T Park (41,517) || 60–61
|-  style="text-align:center; background:#fcc"
| 122 || August 19 || @ Giants || 1–8 || Johnny Cueto (14–3) || Seth Lugo (0–2) || — || AT&T Park (41,434) || 60–62
|-  style="text-align:center; background:#cfc"
| 123 || August 20 || @ Giants || 9–5 || Bartolo Colon (11–7) || Matt Moore (7–10) || － || AT&T Park (41,125) || 61–62
|-  style="text-align:center; background:#cfc"
| 124 || August 21 || @ Giants || 2–0 || Noah Syndergaard (11–7) || Jeff Samardzija (9–8) || Jeurys Familia  (41) || AT&T Park (41,377) || 62–62
|-  style="text-align:center; background:#cfc"
| 125 || August 23 || @ Cardinals || 7–4 || Robert Gsellman (1–0) || Jaime Garcia (10–9) || Jeurys Familia (42) || Busch Stadium (40,082) || 63–62
|-  style="text-align:center; background:#fcc"
| 126 || August 24 || @ Cardinals || 1–8 || Carlos Martinez (12–7) || Jacob deGrom (7–7) || — || Busch Stadium (40,053) || 63–63
|-  style="text-align:center; background:#cfc"
| 127 || August 25 || @ Cardinals || 10–6 || Seth Lugo (1–2) || Adam Wainwright (9–8) || － || Busch Stadium (40,023) || 64–63
|-  style="text-align:center; background:#cfc"
| 128 || August 26 || Phillies || 9–4 || Bartolo Colon (12–7) || Adam Morgan (1–8) || － || Citi Field (31,111) || 65–63
|-  style="text-align:center; background:#cfc"
| 129 || August 27 || Phillies || 12–1 || Noah Syndergaard (12–7) || Jeremy Hellickson (10–8) || － || Citi Field (35,832) || 66–63
|-  style="text-align:center; background:#fcc"
| 130 || August 28 || Phillies || 1–5 || David Hernandez (3–3) || Rob Gsellman (1–1) || — || Citi Field (32,033) || 66–64
|-  style="text-align:center; background:#cfc"
| 131 || August 29 || Marlins || 2–1 (10) || Josh Smoker (1–0)|| Nick Wittgren (1–4) || — || Citi Field (32,188) || 67–64
|-  style="text-align:center; background:#cfc"
| 132 || August 30 || Marlins || 7–4 || Seth Lugo (2–2) || Tom Koehler (9–10) || Jeurys Familia (43) || Citi Field (32,634) || 68–64
|-  style="text-align:center; background:#cfc"
| 133 || August 31 || Marlins || 5–2 || Addison Reed (4–2) || A.J. Ramos (1–2) || Jeurys Familia (44) || Citi Field (33,471) || 69–64
|-

|-  style="text-align:center; background:#fcc"
| 134 || September 1 || Marlins || 4–6 || José Ureña (3–5) || Jacob deGrom (7–8) || — || Citi Field (29,330) || 69–65
|-  style="text-align:center; background:#fcc"
| 135 || September 2 || Nationals || 1–4 || A. J. Cole (1–1) || Noah Syndergaard (12–8) || Mark Melancon (38) || Citi Field (32,040) || 69–66
|-  style="text-align:center; background:#cfc"
| 136 || September 3 || Nationals || 3–1 || Robert Gsellman (2–1) || Tanner Roark (14–8) || Jeurys Familia (45) || Citi Field (36,118) || 70–66
|-  style="text-align:center; background:#cfc"
| 137 || September 4 || Nationals || 5–1 || Seth Lugo (3–2) || Reynaldo López (2–3) || — || Citi Field (30,257) || 71–66
|-  style="text-align:center; background:#cfc"
| 138 || September 5 || @ Reds || 5–0 || Bartolo Colon (13–7) || Robert Stephenson (2–1) || — || Great American Ball Park (18,169) || 72–66
|-  style="text-align:center; background:#cfc"
| 139 || September 6 || @ Reds || 5–3 || Josh Smoker (2–0) || Michael Lorenzen (2–1) || Jeurys Familia (46) || Great American Ball Park (13,359) || 73–66
|-  style="text-align:center; background:#cfc"
| 140 || September 7 || @ Reds || 6–3 || Noah Syndergaard (13–8) || Anthony DeSclafani (8–3) || Jeurys Familia (47) || Great American Ball Park (13,936) || 74–66
|-  style="text-align:center; background:#cfc"
| 141 || September 9 || @ Braves || 6–4 || Hansel Robles (6–4) || Mauricio Cabrera (3–1) || Jeurys Familia (48) || Turner Field (28,225) || 75–66
|-  style="text-align:center; background:#fcc"
| 142 || September 10 || @ Braves || 3–4 (10) || Chris Withrow (3–0) || Erik Goeddel (1–1) || — || Turner Field (47,841) || 75–67
|-  style="text-align:center; background:#cfc"
| 143 || September 11 || @ Braves || 10–3 ||  Seth Lugo (4–2) || Williams Perez (2–3) || — || Turner Field (32,829) || 76–67
|-  style="text-align:center; background:#fcc"
| 144 || September 12 || @ Nationals || 1–8 || Reynaldo López (3–3) || Rafael Montero (0–1) || — || Nationals Park (22,832) || 76–68
|-  style="text-align:center; background:#cfc"
| 145 || September 13 || @ Nationals || 4–3 (10) || Jeurys Familia (3–3) || Mark Melancon (2–2) || Jerry Blevins (1) || Nationals Park (25,796) || 77–68
|-  style="text-align:center; background:#fcc"
| 146 || September 14 || @ Nationals || 0–1 || Tanner Roark (15–8) || Fernando Salas (0–1) || Mark Melancon (42) || Nationals Park (29,669) || 77–69
|-  style="text-align:center; background:#cfc"
| 147 || September 16 || Twins || 3–0 || Bartolo Colon (14–7) || José Berríos (2–7) || Jeurys Familia (49) || Citi Field (33,338) || 78–69
|-  style="text-align:center; background:#cfc"
| 148 || September 17 || Twins || 3–2 (12) || Josh Edgin (1–0) || Ryan O'Rourke (0–1) || — || Citi Field (36,941) || 79–69
|-  style="text-align:center; background:#cfc"
| 149 || September 18 || Twins || 3–2 ||Erik Goeddel (2–1) || Kyle Gibson (6–10)  || Jerry Blevins (2) || Citi Field (28,926) || 80–69
|-  style="text-align:center; background:#fcc"
| 150 || September 19 || Braves || 3–7 || Aaron Blair (1–6) || Noah Syndergaard (13–9) || — || Citi Field (29,665) || 80–70
|-  style="text-align:center; background:#fcc"
| 151 || September 20 || Braves || 4–5 ||  Julio Teherán (6–10) ||Robert Gsellman (2–2)||  Jim Johnson (16) || Citi Field (30,764) || 80–71
|-  style="text-align:center; background:#fcc"
| 152 || September 21 || Braves || 3–4 ||  Ian Krol (2–0) ||Jeurys Familia (3–4)||  Jim Johnson (17) || Citi Field (32,187) || 80–72
|-  style="text-align:center; background:#cfc"
| 153 || September 22 || Phillies || 9–8 (11) ||Jim Henderson (2–2)||Edubray Ramos (1–3)||—|| Citi Field (35,759) ||81–72
|-  style="text-align:center; background:#cfc"
| 154 || September 23 || Phillies || 10–5 ||Josh Smoker (2–0)||Jeremy Hellickson (12–10)||Hansel Robles (1)|| Citi Field (37,873) ||82–72
|-  style="text-align:center; background:#fcc"
| 155 || September 24 || Phillies || 8–10 ||Alec Asher (2–0)||Sean Gilmartin (0–1)||Michael Mariot (2)|| Citi Field (39,995) ||82–73
|-  style="text-align:center; background:#cfc"
| 156 || September 25 || Phillies || 17–0 ||Robert Gsellman (3–2)||Jake Thompson (3–6)||—|| Citi Field (35,093) ||83–73
|-  style="text-align:center; background:#fcc"
| 157 || September 26 || @ Marlins || 3–7 ||Mike Dunn (5–1)||Bartolo Colon (14–8)||—|| Marlins Park || 83–74
|-  style="text-align:center; background:#cfc"
| 158 || September 27 || @ Marlins || 12–1 ||Noah Syndergaard (14–9)||Tom Koehler (9–13)||—|| Marlins Park || 84–74
|-  style="text-align:center; background:#cfc"
| 159 || September 28 || @ Marlins || 5–2 ||Seth Lugo (5–2)||José Ureña (4–9)||Jeurys Familia (50)|| Marlins Park || 85–74
|-  style="text-align:center; background:#cfc"
| 160 || September 30 || @ Phillies || 5–1 ||Robert Gsellman (4–2)||Alec Asher (2–1)||—|| Citizens Bank Park || 86–74
|-  style="text-align:center; background:#cfc"
| 161 || October 1 || @ Phillies || 5–3 ||Bartolo Colon (15–8)||Patrick Schuster (0–1)||Jeurys Familia (51)|| Citizens Bank Park || 87–74
|- style="text-align:center; background:#fcc"
| 162 || October 2 || @ Phillies || 2–5 ||Colton Murray (1–1)||Erik Goeddel (1–2)||Héctor Neris (2)|| Citizens Bank Park || 87–75
|-

Postseason

|-  style="text-align:center; background:#fcc"
| 1 || October 5 || Giants || 0–3 || Bumgarner (1–0) || Familia (0–1) || || Citi Field || 0–1
|-

Postseason rosters

| style="text-align:left" |
Pitchers: 27 Jeurys Familia 34 Noah Syndergaard 39 Jerry Blevins 40 Bartolo Colón 43 Addison Reed 47 Hansel Robles 59 Fernando Salas 65 Robert Gsellman 66 Josh Edgin 
Catchers: 18 Travis d'Arnaud 26 Kevin Plawecki 44 René Rivera
Infielders: 7 José Reyes 13 Asdrúbal Cabrera 28 James Loney 29 Eric Campbell 54 T.J. Rivera 55 Kelly Johnson 56 Ty Kelly 
Outfielders: 3 Curtis Granderson 12 Juan Lagares 16 Alejandro De Aza 19 Jay Bruce 30 Michael Conforto 52 Yoenis Céspedes
|- valign="top"

Roster

Statistics

Batting

Players in bold are on the active roster.

Note: G = Games played; AB = At bats; R = Runs; H = Hits; 2B = Doubles; 3B = Triples; HR = Home runs; RBI = Runs batted in; BB = Walks; SO = Strikeouts; Avg. = Batting average; OBP = On-base percentage; SLG = Slugging percentage; SB = Stolen bases

Pitching

Players in bold are on the active roster.Note: W = Wins; L = Losses; ERA = Earned run average; G = Games pitched; GS = Games started; SV = Saves; IP = Innings pitched; H = Hits allowed; R = Runs allowed; ER = Earned runs allowed; HR = Home runs allowed; BB = Walks allowed; K = Strikeouts''

Farm system

References

External links

 2016 New York Mets season official site
 2016 New York Mets season at Baseball Reference
 2016 New York Mets season at ESPN

New York Mets seasons
New York Mets season
New York Mets
2010s in Queens
Flushing, Queens